The 1996 Wismilak International was a very good women's tennis tournament played on outdoor hard courts in Surabaya in Indonesia that was part of Tier IV of the 1996 WTA Tour. It was the third edition of the tournament and was held from 7 October until 13 October 1996. Second-seeded Shi-Ting Wang won her second consecutive singles title at the event.

Finals

Singles

 Shi-Ting Wang defeated  Nana Miyagi 6–4, 6–0
 It was Wang's first singles title of the year and the fifth of her career.

Doubles

 Alexandra Fusai /  Kerry-Anne Guse defeated  Tina Križan /  Noëlle van Lottum 6–4, 6–4
 It was Fusai's only title of the year and the first of her career. It was Guse's only title of the year and the third of her career.

References

External links
 ITF tournament edition details
 Tournament draws

Wismilak International
Commonwealth Bank Tennis Classic
1996 in Indonesian tennis